Whitchurch Halt railway station served the village of Whitchurch, Somerset, England on the Bristol and North Somerset Railway.

History 
The station opened on 1 January 1925 by the Great Western Railway. It was situated adjacent to the A37 on Wells Road. Behind the station was an orchard. The station closed to both passengers and goods traffic on 2 November 1959.

References

External links 

Disused railway stations in Somerset
Former Great Western Railway stations
Railway stations in Great Britain opened in 1925
Railway stations in Great Britain closed in 1959
1925 establishments in England
1959 disestablishments in England